Abeygunawardena is a Sinhalese surname. Notable people with the surname include:

Harishchandra Abeygunawardena, Sri Lankan academic
Rohitha Abeygunawardena (born 1966), Sri Lankan politician and businessman
Sumanadasa Abeygunawardena (born 1953), Sri Lankan astrologer, author, and commentator

Sinhalese surnames